Church of Scars is the debut studio album by British singer and songwriter Bishop Briggs. The album was released on 20 April 2018 through Island Records.

Critical reception

In a rave review, Jenna Mohammed, writing for Exclaim! called McLaughlin's voice "immensely powerful". Mohammed described the album as "high-energy from start to finish", and that her "style and essence is very reminiscent of Florence + the Machine and Banks, but she sets herself apart through intense beat drops and her gospel choir roots". In a more mixed review, Sal Cinquemani, writing for Slant Magazine described the album as "largely joyless", saying that "across 10 tracks, though, Briggs's formula ultimately reveals itself to be one-note."

Track listing

Charts

References

2018 debut albums
Bishop Briggs albums
Island Records albums